In mathematics, positive definiteness is a property of any object to which a bilinear form or a sesquilinear form may be naturally associated, which is positive-definite. See, in particular:

 Positive-definite bilinear form
 Positive-definite function
 Positive-definite function on a group
 Positive-definite functional
 Positive-definite kernel
 Positive-definite matrix
 Positive-definite quadratic form

References
. 
.

Quadratic forms